1994 Shane, provisional designation , is a dark Adeonian asteroid from the central region of the asteroid belt, approximately 25 kilometers in diameter.

It was discovered on 4 October 1961, by astronomers of the Indiana Asteroid Program conducted at the Goethe Link Observatory near Brooklyn, Indiana, United States. It was later named after American astronomer C. Donald Shane.

Orbit and classification 

Shane is a member of the Adeona family, a large family of carbonaceous asteroids.

The asteroid orbits the Sun in the intermediate main belt at a distance of 2.1–3.2 AU once every 4 years and 5 months (1,603 days). Its orbit has an eccentricity of 0.21 and an inclination of 10° with respect to the ecliptic.

Lightcurve 

In October 2009, a rotational lightcurve of Shane was obtained from photometric observations at the Via Capote Observatory  in California. It gave a well-defined rotation period of 8.22 hours with a brightness variation of 0.26 magnitude, superseding a previously obtained period of 8 hours from 1996.

Diameter and albedo 

According to observations made by the Infrared Astronomical Satellite IRAS, Shane has an albedo of 0.06, while the survey carried out by the Japanese Akari satellite rendered a higher albedo of 0.13 with a corresponding diameter of 18 kilometers. The Collaborative Asteroid Lightcurve Link derives an even lower albedo of 0.04, yet does not classify it as a carbonaceous but rather as a S-type asteroid, which typically have much higher albedos due to their stony surface composition.

Naming 

This minor planet was named after American astronomer Charles Donald Shane (1895–1983), director of Lick Observatory, second president of AURA, and instrumental for the establishment of the Cerro Tololo Inter-American Observatory in Chile.

Shane played a major role in the planning and construction of the first telescopes and buildings on Kitt Peak National Observatory as well. The 3-meter C. Donald Shane telescope, located at Lick Observatory, was also named after him. The approved naming citation was published by the Minor Planet Center on 1 March 1981.

References

External links

 Asteroid Lightcurve Database (LCDB), query form (info )
 Dictionary of Minor Planet Names, Google books
 Asteroids and comets rotation curves, CdR – Observatoire de Genève, Raoul Behrend
 Discovery Circumstances: Numbered Minor Planets (1)-(5000) – Minor Planet Center
 
 

001994
001994
Named minor planets
19611004